Voaltz / Rereler is a limited-edition remix single by Boredoms, released on August 30, 2008, on 12″ vinyl. The single contains remixes of both songs from the bonus CD that came with the Live at Sunflancisco DVD.

Track listing
"Voaltz (U-Bus Remix by Altz / Kabamix)"
"Rereler (Di Coswamp mix)"

References

Boredoms albums
2008 remix albums